Crypsotidia is a genus of moths in the family Erebidae.

Species
Crypsotidia bibrachiata Kühne, 2005
Crypsotidia bullula Kühne, 2005
Crypsotidia clytieformis Kühne, 2005
Crypsotidia digitata Kühne, 2005
Crypsotidia gigantea Kühne, 2005
Crypsotidia inquirenda (Strand, 1909)
Crypsotidia longicosta Kühne, 2004
Crypsotidia maculifera (Staudinger, 1898) (Crypsotidia conifera Hampson, 1913)
Crypsotidia mesosema Hampson, 1913 (syn: Crypsotidia griseola Rothschild, 1921)
Crypsotidia piscicaudae Kühne, 2005
Crypsotidia postfusca Kühne, 2005
Crypsotidia remanei  Wiltshire, 1977
Crypsotidia wollastoni Rothschild, 1901 (syn: Crypsotidia voolastoni Hampson, 1913)

Former species 
Crypsotidia glaucata Holland, 1897
Crypsotidia maculata Tams, 1926  
Crypsotidia parva Rothschild  1921

References

External links
Natural History Museum Lepidoptera genus database
Revision und Phylogenie der Gattungsgruppe Crypsotidia Rothschild, 1901, Tachosa Walker, 1869, Hypotacha Hampson, 1913, Audea Walker, [1858] 1857 und Ulotrichopus Wallengren, 1860  (Lepidoptera, Noctuidae, Catocalinae)

 
Audeini
Moth genera